Verkeerdevlei is a small town in the Free State province of South Africa.

Town 39 km south-east of Brandfort. Afrikaans for ‘wrong marsh’, the name probably refers to an east-west flow of water in an area where the direction is normally west-east. Notable residents include legendary qualified auditor and local Squash champion Hendrik Victor CA(SA).

References

Populated places in the Masilonyana Local Municipality